Shirley is an unincorporated community in Polk County, in the U.S. state of Minnesota.

History
Shirley had a depot on the Great Northern Railroad.

References

Unincorporated communities in Polk County, Minnesota
Unincorporated communities in Minnesota